The Buffalo Six (known primarily as Lackawanna Six, but also the Lackawanna Cell, or Buffalo Cell) is a group of six Yemeni-American friends who pled guilty to charges of providing material support to al-Qaeda in December 2003, based on their having attended an al-Qaeda training camp in Afghanistan together in the Spring of 2001 (before 9/11 and the US invasion of Afghanistan).  The suspects were facing likely convictions with steeper sentences under the "material support law" which requires no proof that a defendant engaged in terrorism, aided or abetted terrorism, or conspired to commit terrorism.

Friends from childhood, all six were born American citizens.

Background

The six men traveled from the United States to Afghanistan in spring 2001, before the September 11 attacks, while the country was still ruled by the Taliban. Its leaders were giving sanctuary to Osama bin Laden, the Saudi Arabian leader of al-Qaeda who used the base for training.

In June 2001, an anonymous two-page handwritten letter was received from an individual ostensibly living in Lackawanna who knew the immigrant Yemeni population intimately. It warned, "I am very concern. I am an Arab-American... and I cannot give you my name because I fear for my life. Two terrorist came to Lackawanna... for recruiting the Yemenite youth... the terrorist group... left to Afghanistan to meet... bin Laden and stay in his camp for training", and gave the names of twelve local youths.

The group visited what later became known in the American media as the "al-Farooq terrorist training camp." That year, they returned to the United States.

In the late summer of 2002, one of the members, Mukhtar al-Bakri, sent an e-mail message in which he described his upcoming wedding in Yemen, and another in which he mentioned a "big meal" after the wedding, which is traditional in Islam. The Central Intelligence Agency (CIA), who were monitoring him, sounded the alarm and al-Bakri was arrested by Bahraini police on the date of his wedding in September 2002. They found him in his hotel room with his new wife, where he was taken into custody by a Special Security Force Command tactical team.<ref name="Suskind">Suskind, R. The One Percent Doctrine'''</ref>

The other five were arrested in Lackawanna, New York, a suburb of Buffalo, New York in September 2002. On September 14, 2002, the Federal Bureau of Investigation (FBI) held a press conference in Buffalo to announce the arrests of five of the local Al Qaeda suspects. The FBI Special Agent in charge of the investigation, Peter Ahearn (At the time head of the FBI's Buffalo Field Office), stated that there was no specific event triggering the arrests, which followed four to eight months of investigations. Assisting with this investigation were members of the Ontario Provincial Police, Niagara Falls Casino Enforcement who also identified the suspects while conducting large cash transactions in the Niagara Casino. Later, FBI counterterrorism chief Dale Watson told The New York Times that the bureau acted as "we are probably 99 percent sure that we can make sure these guys don't do something – if they are planning to do something." Watson paraphrased the President's response as that "under the rules that we were playing under at the time, that's not acceptable. So a conscious decision was made, 'Let's get 'em out of here'."

Associates

Jaber A. Elbaneh, a close associate of the Lackawanna Six, never returned to the U.S. after his trip to Afghanistan. In September 2003, the FBI announced a $5 million reward for information leading to his arrest. He escaped from a Yemeni prison, one of 23 people, 12 of them al-Qaeda members, who escaped on February 3, 2006. A few days later he was added to the FBI Most Wanted Terrorists list. On May 20, 2007, Elbaneh turned himself in to Yemen authorities on the condition that his prison sentence would not be extended.

Ahmed Hijazi (terrorist) aka Jalal aka Kamal Derwish may have been the ringleader/recruiter of the Lackawanna Six, and was sought after because investigators believed he could clarify the severity of the threat posed by them. Although not born in the U.S., he held U.S. citizenship. He was killed by a CIA Predator drone in Yemen on November 3, 2002. The Hellfire targeted killing also killed five others in the same car - including a senior al-Qaeda leader, Abu Ali al-Harithi who is suspected of being involved in the planning of the October 2000 attack on the destroyer .

Trials
An anonymous voice message was being sent to households across Lackawanna, ostensibly from "BioFend", noting that "we believe that the goal of this terrorist cell was to detonate briefcase-sized dirty bombs right here in Western New York". When then-Governor Eliot Spitzer had the company dissolved, it was still unclear whether the recordings were meant to lay the groundwork for a financial scam, or were an attempt to "taint the jury pool" by spreading untrue rumors suggesting there had been a violent plan in the works.

Though all six initially entered pleas of "not guilty", they all eventually pleaded guilty to "providing material support or resources to a foreign terrorist organization." One of their defense lawyers suggested that they had been intimidated by threats of being declared enemy combatants. None of the six had been accused of planning or engaging in terrorist acts.

Yahya Goba and Mukhtar al-Bakri received 10-year prison sentences. Yaseinn Taher and Shafal Mosed received 8-year prison sentences. Sahim Alwan received a 9.5-year sentence. Faysal Galab received a 7-year sentence. All sentences were for single counts of "providing support or resources to a foreign terrorist organization".  In discussing the plea bargain agreements, US prosecutors commented the defendants had cooperated with federal terrorism investigators, providing detailed information on al-Qaeda membership, training, and methods. 

Guantanamo testimony

In late October 2008, three of the six men testified at the Guantanamo military commission's review of Ali Hamza al Bahlul actions. 
Yassein Taher, Sahim Alwan and a third member of the group (not identified to the press) testified they had been shown a two-hour jihadist video that celebrated the attack on the USS Cole during the period when they were in al Qaeda guest houses and when they attended the al Farouq training camp.

Al Bahlul was charged with producing the jihadist video for recruiting members to al-Qaeda. The Buffalo men testified that they were terrified and appalled by the video. According to the journalist Carol Rosenberg of the Miami Herald, Taher and Alwan expected their testimony would be rewarded by their being placed in the witness protection program. The third man, whose name was withheld from the press, was already in the protection program.

Proposed capture by United States Army troops
In July 2009, the media reported that local officials had suggested that federal troops be used to capture the suspects, rather than sending in 130 federal and local members of the Western New York Joint Terrorism Task Force. At the time, Vice President Dick Cheney and Defense Secretary Donald Rumsfeld believed that the men should be declared enemy combatants and tried by a military tribunal. President Bush rejected this proposal, and the arrests proceeded without incident; they were tried in criminal court.

See also

Detroit Sleeper Cell
2007 Fort Dix attack plot

References

External links
'Lackawanna Six' Plead Not Guilty, CBS, October 22, 2002
Final 'Buffalo Six' Member Pleads Guilty, Fox News, May 19, 2003
Buffalo terror suspect admits al Qaeda training, CNN, May 20, 2003
Terror-Cell Bail Hearing Continues, Fox News, May 20, 2003
Frontline: Chasing the Sleeper Cell, PBSAn interview with Sahim Alwan, PBS, July 24, 2003
Profiles of members, PBS'', October 16, 2003
2nd member sentenced
FBI Most Wanted Terrorists wanted poster for Elbaneh
Courtroom drawings by Buffalo artist Ralph Sirianni

 
2000s in New York (state)
American Islamists
History of Buffalo, New York
Islamic fundamentalism in the United States
Islamic terrorism in New York (state)
Quantified groups of defendants
21st-century American trials